Andliga sånger 2 is a 1993 studio album by Christer Sjögren, consisting of Christian songs.

Track listing
Jag skall gå genom tysta skyar
Säg, känner du det underbara namnet
Blott en dag
Varför skola mänskor strida
Han visar vägen
His Hand in Mine
Låt oss alla en gång mötas
Härlighetens morgon
Som ett ljus
De kommer från öst och väst|De komma från öst och väst
Någonstans bland alla skuggorna står Jesus
In My Fathers House
Där rosor aldrig dör
Tänk att få vakna

Contributors
Klas Anderhell – drums
Rutger Gunnarsson – bass
Peter Ljung – keyboard
Lasse Wellander – guitar

Charts

References 

1993 albums
Christer Sjögren albums